Rakefet is a community settlement in northern Israel. Located in the Lower Galilee near Sakhnin, it falls under the jurisdiction of Misgav Regional Council.

History
The village was established in 1981 as a moshav shitufi; its name means "Cyclamen". In August 1989 it was converted to a community settlement.

In September 2011 a High Court of Justice ordered the Israel Lands Administration to allocate a plot of state land to an Arab couple, Fatina and Ahmed Zabeidat. The ruling came after the Arab couple was first denied a membership in the community.

References

External links
Official website (Hebrew)

Community settlements
Former moshavim
Populated places established in 1981
Populated places in Northern District (Israel)
1981 establishments in Israel